Nathaline Karkour Gilinguirian (born 12 April 1986) is a Lebanese footballer, futsal player and coach who plays for Lebanese club Beirut Football Academy. She represented Lebanon internationally in both football and futsal.

Club career
Gilinguirian played football and futsal for Shabab Arabi in 2012, SAS in 2017, and Zouk Mosbeh in 2018. She has played for Beirut Football Academy (BFA) since 2018.

International career
Gilinguirian played for Lebanon in the 2010 Arabia Women's Cup, and the qualifiers for the 2014 AFC Women's Asian Cup. She also represented the national futsal team in the 2018 AFC Women's Futsal Championship.

Coaching career 
Gilinguirian was the physiotherapist of the women's national under-15 team at the 2018 WAFF U-15 Girls Championship. In August 2018, she was appointed goalkeeper coach and physiotherapist of BFA. In 2019, she was the physiotherapist of the women's national under-18 team.

See also
 List of Lebanon women's international footballers

References

External links
 
 

1986 births
Living people
Lebanese people of Armenian descent
Ethnic Armenian sportspeople
Sportspeople from Aleppo
Lebanese women's footballers
Lebanese women's futsal players
Women's association football goalkeepers
Futsal goalkeepers
Stars Association for Sports players
Zouk Mosbeh SC footballers
Beirut Football Academy players
Lebanese Women's Football League players
Lebanon women's international footballers
Association football goalkeeping coaches
Lebanese physiotherapists